James G. Oxley is an Australian–American mathematician, Boyd Professor of Mathematics at Louisiana State University. He is known for his expertise in matroid theory and graph theory.

Oxley did his undergraduate studies in Australia, and earned a doctorate from the University of Oxford in 1978, under the supervision of Dominic Welsh. He joined the Louisiana State University faculty in 1982.

Oxley is the author of the book Matroid Theory (Oxford University Press, 1992).

In 2012 he became a fellow of the American Mathematical Society.

References

Year of birth missing (living people)
Living people
20th-century American mathematicians
21st-century American mathematicians
Australian mathematicians
Graph theorists
Alumni of the University of Oxford
Louisiana State University faculty
Fellows of the American Mathematical Society